Dogface is a nickname for a United States Army soldier, especially an enlisted infantryman. The term gained widespread use during World War II.

History
The term "dogface" to describe an American soldier appeared in print at least as early as 1935. Though its precise origin is uncertain, contemporaneous newspapers accounted for the nickname by explaining that soldiers "wear dog-tags, sleep in pup tents, and are always growling about something" and "the army is a dog's life . . . and when they want us, they whistle for us."

During World War II, the nickname came to be seen as a self-appointed term of endearment for soldiers, but as an insult if used by others, such as United States Marine Corps personnel.

In media
In 1942, Bert Gold and Ken Hart, two members of the United States Army Air Forces, published a song called "The Dogface Soldier," which one newspaper called an "authentic foxhole folksong." The song became the theme of the 3rd Infantry Division and was featured in the 1955 film To Hell and Back starring Audie Murphy, who served in the 3rd Division. A recording of the song by Russ Morgan, taken from the film, became a No. 30 pop hit in the U.S. the same year.

See also
Devil Dog
Doughboy
G.I.

References

Military slang and jargon
United States Army traditions